Sipa is a Philippines national and traditional native sport.

Sipa or SIPA may also refer to:

 School of International and Public Affairs, a Columbia University graduate school
 Southern Interscholastic Press Association, a nonprofit organization at the University of South Carolina
 Sipa, Estonia, a village
 Société Industrielle Pour l’Aéronautique, a defunct French aircraft maker
 State Investigation and Protection Agency, a law enforcement agency in Bosnia and Herzegovina
 Șipa River, a tributary of the Prahova River in Romania
 Sipa Press, a French photojournalism agency
 Securities Investor Protection Act, United States federal legislation from 1970